Ron Josiah Taylor, AM (8 March 19349 September 2012) was a prominent Australian shark expert, as is his widow, Valerie Taylor. They were credited with being pioneers in several areas, including being the first people to film great white sharks without the protection of a cage. Their expertise has been called upon for films such as Jaws, Orca and Sky Pirates.

Biography
Ronald Taylor began diving in 1952 and became interested in spearfishing and underwater photography. He met Valerie while both were members of the St George Spearfishing Club in Sydney. They became champion spearfishers, but switched from killing sharks to filming them after becoming fascinated with marine life. They married in December 1963. They made their living in the 1960s by making wet suits and selling underwater cameras, plus doing artwork for magazines.

Taylor won the Australian Open Spearfishing Championships for four years in succession before winning the World Spearfishing Championship in Tahiti in 1965.

Taylor's first major underwater film production, The Shark Hunters (1962), was made with diving and business partner Ben Cropp. In 1964, he made the Slaughter at Saumarez, the first Australian diving adventure to the Coral Sea aboard professional fishing boat Riversong with free divers John Harding, Bob Grounds and Ron Zangari with Captain Wally Muller.

In 1966, the Taylors sold their shark documentary Revenge of a Shark Victim to producer Robert Raymond who won a Logie Award for his adaptation with new footage.

The Taylors were employed by the Belgian Scientific Expedition to the Great Barrier Reef as advisers and 35 mm underwater cinematographers, for six months, the first major educational project of this type on the Great Barrier Reef sponsored by University of Liège, Belgium. In 1969, Ron co-filmed Blue Water, White Death with Stan Waterman, Peter Lake and Peter Gimbel.

In 1974, the Taylors, assisted by Rodney Fox (above water), filmed the live shark underwater sequences for Jaws. They also filmed the live shark underwater sequences for Jaws 2 (1978) and the shark sequences for the film Orca (1976). In 1978, they published Great Shark Stories book.

Taylor first devised an idea of a diver wearing a full-length chain-mail suit over a wet suit as possible protection against shark bite in the 1960s but it was more than a decade before the suit was made and tested but it was found the suit was too small for Ron so Valerie wore it to test it with sharks.

In 1979, the Taylors filmed the underwater scenes for, The Blue Lagoon. While on a dive trip in 1981, the Taylors discovered mining claims on several Coral Sea Islands. They brought this to the attention of the Australian Federal Government and saved these remote bird breeding islands.

Wreck of the Yongala, a TV documentary, was made in 1982, showcasing what was then the most spectacular of shipwrecks in shallow water. It was instrumental in having the wreck protected from fishing. The Taylors, inspired by Cairns game fishing charter boat captain Peter Bristow, lobbied via the media, the Queensland Government and National Parks to have the potato cod of Cormorant Pass near Lizard Island protected.

They were the first people to film great white sharks without the protection of a cage or anything else during the making of the series Blue Wilderness, Episode, Shark Shocker in January 1992, a huge milestone in ocean exploration together with South Africans Theo Ferreira, Craig Ferreira, George Askew and Piet van der Walt, founders of the South African great white shark cage diving industry. They tested an electronic shark-repelling barrier there. They were also the first to film sharks by night. Shadow over the Reef (1993) was filmed at Ningaloo Reef, Western Australia and was instrumental in preventing the test drilling for oil inside the Ningaloo Marine Park. The Taylors' documentary Shark Pod (1997) used the Protective Oceanic Device invented in South Africa by Norman Starkey of the Natal Sharks Board against great white sharks, tiger sharks, hammerhead sharks, and other shark species.

Taylor died on 9 September 2012 at age 78, following a two-year battle with acute myeloid leukemia.

The Realm of the Shark is a biographical account of the Taylors' lives between the late 1950s, and the late 1980s.

Selected works

Filmography

Documentary films
 Playing with Sharks for Movietone News, 1962
 Shark Hunters, 1963; with Ben Cropp
 Slaughter at Saumarez, 1964
 Skindiving Paradise, 1965
 Revenge of a Shark Victim, 1965; about Rodney Fox (re-edited by Robert Raymond into SHARK which subsequently received a Logie Award)
 Surf Scene, 1965, featuring top surfers Robert Conneeley, Russell Hughes, Kevin Brennan and Tanya Binning surfing new locations at Noosa Head and Double Island Point, Queensland.
 Will the Barrier Reef Cure Claude Clough?, 1966
 Belgian Scientific Expedition, for University of Liège 1967
 The Underwater World of Ron Taylor, 1967, narrated live by Ron Taylor
 The Cave Divers, 1967; for W.D. & H.O. Wills (Aust), filmed in the area surrounding Mount Gambier, South Australia.
 Sharks, 1975; for Time-Life Television
 The Great Barrier Reef, 1978; for Time-Life Television
 The Wreck of the Yongala, 1981
 The Great Barrier Reef (IMAX), 1982; technical consultants
 Operation Shark Bite, 1982
 Give Sharks a Chance, 1991; with Richard Dennison for National Geographic Society and the Australian Broadcasting Corporation
 Shark Shocker 1993 (with Richard Dennison) for Channel 4 UK
 Shadow over the Reef, 1993
 Mystique of the Pearl, for Film Australia, 1995
 Shark Pod, 1996
 Shadow of the Shark, 1999; for Australian Geographic, directed by Tina Dalton-Hagege

Television series and movies
 Skippy the Bush Kangaroo, Episode 3 – Golden Reef  (1968) – original story & Episode 57 – The Shark Taggers(1969) – underwater sequences
 Contrabandits (30 episode series), 1967–68; underwater sequences and diving instruction for cast
 Barrier Reef (39-episode series), 1971–1972; direction of underwater photography, stunt work and minor acting roles
 Taylor's Inner Space (13-episode series), 1972–1973 with soundtrack composed by Sven Libaek and narration by William Shatner
Those Amazing Animals, 1980–1981; contributed to underwater segments 
 Fortress, 1985; underwater sequences
 Blue Wilderness (6 episodes), 1992; with Richard Dennison for National Geographic and the Australian Broadcasting Corporation
 Flipper, 1995 series; underwater still photography

Films 
 Age of Consent, 1968
 The Intruders (also known as Skippy and the Intruders), 1969
 Blue Water, White Death, 1971
 Jaws, 1975
 Orca, 1976; live shark sequences
 The Last Wave, 1977; underwater sequences
 Jaws 2, 1978
 Gallipoli, 1981; underwater sequences
  A Dangerous Summer , 1982: underwater sequences
 Year of Living Dangerously, 1982
 The Blue Lagoon, 1980; underwater sequences
 The Silent One, 1983
 Sky Pirates, 1984, underwater sequences
 Frog Dreaming, 1986
 The Rescue, for Walt Disney, 1987
 Return to the Blue Lagoon, 1990, underwater sequences
 Honeymoon in Vegas, 1991, underwater sequences
 Police Story 4: First Strike, 1995; underwater sequences
 The Island of Dr Moreau, 1995, live shark sequences

Bibliography
 Taylor, Ron; (1965), Ron Taylor's shark fighters: underwater in colour, John Harding Underwater Promotions, Glebe, NSW.
 Taylor, Ron & Valerie; (1976), Ron and Valerie Taylor's Underwater World, Ure Smith, Sydney.
 Taylor, Ron & Valerie; (1977), Sangosho no taiwa (publisher not cited), Tokyo.  (Japanese translation of Ron and Valerie Taylor's Underwater World as published by Ure Smith in 1976)
 Taylor, Ron & Valerie; Goadby, Peter; editors (1978), Great shark stories, Collins, London, England
 Taylor, Valerie; (1981), The great shark suit experiment, Ron Taylor Film Productions
 Taylor, Ron & Valerie; Croll, Ian; editor (1982), The Great Barrier Reef: nature's gift to Australia-Australia's gift to the world, Beer Productions, Cairns
 Taylor, Ron & Valerie; Goadby, Peter; editors (1986), Great shark stories, Crowood Press, Marlborough, England
 Taylor, R. & Taylor, V.; (1986), Sharks: Silent Hunters of the Deep, Reader's Digest (Australia) Pty Ltd, Surrey Hills, NSW, Australia (hardback).
 Taylor, Ron & Valerie; (1987), Papua New Guinea marine fishes, Robert Brown & Associates, Bathurst, NSW (pbk.) (pbk.)
 Taylor, Ron & Valerie; (1997), Blue Wilderness, Fourth Day Publishing

Awards, honours and other recognitions

Ron 
1962 – Encyclopædia Britannica Award for Playing With Sharks
1966 – the NOGI statuette for Education and Sports (then awarded by the Underwater Society of America)
1993 – SSI Platinum Pro 5000 Diver 
2003 – Member of the Order of Australia (AM)
Citation: For service to conservation and the environment through marine cinematography and photography, by raising awareness of endangered and potentially extinct marine species, and by contributing to the declaration of species and habitat protection.

Ron and Valerie 
1992 – Australian Geographic Adventurer of the Year
1997 – the jury award for the film Shark Pod at the Antibes Underwater Festival, France
1998 – the Golden Palm Award for the book Blue Wilderness at the 25th World Festival of Underwater Pictures in Antibes, France.
2000 – International Scuba Diving Hall of Fame
2002 – Wildlife Preservation Society of Australia's Serventy Conservation Medal
2008 – Australian Geographic Lifetime of Conservation Award
2011 – Australian Cinematographers Society Hall of Fame
Life membership of the St George Spearfishing & Freediving Club Inc. (date of conferral not stated)
2012 – renaming of the newly declared Neptune Islands Group Marine Park surrounding the Neptune Islands in South Australia to the Neptune Islands Group (Ron and Valerie Taylor) Marine Park

See also

References

Further reading
  (includes interview with Ron and Valerie Taylor)

External links
 Ron and Valerie Taylor's Facebook page
 Ocean Artists Society page for Valerie Taylor
 Ron Taylor obituary, Sydney Morning Herald
 Valerie Taylor video and stills 2003
Australian spearfishing championships 1960s
 Cinema newsreels photographed by Ron Taylor 1960s
 Ron Taylor wins world championship 1965 in Tahiti
  The Blue Lagoon
 Diving in 1964 (Includes Ron Taylor's Slaughter at Saumarez, 360P)
 Taylor's save a Great white shark 1970
 Valerie Taylor pictures New Skindiving Paradise

1934 births
2012 deaths
Australian underwater divers
People from Sydney
Underwater photographers
Australian documentary filmmakers
Underwater filmmakers
Deaths from leukemia
Deaths from cancer in New South Wales